Jamaican singer and songwriter Marion Hall (formerly known as Lady Saw) has released ten studio albums, two compilation albums, three extended plays, and 47 singles. Her success has earned her the honorific title The Queen of Dancehall.

As Lady Saw, she released a total eight studio albums: Lover Girl (1994), Give Me The Reason (1996), Passion (1997), 99 Ways (1998), Strip Tease (2004), Walk Out (2007), My Way (2010), and Alter Ego (2012). In 2002, Saw experienced international success with her collaboration single "Underneath It All" with American ska band No Doubt. The song won a Grammy Award for Best Pop Performance by a Duo or Group with Vocal at the 46th Grammy Awards. In 2004, Saw released "I've Got Your Man", the lead single of Strip Tease, which crossed-over on the R&B charts and peaked at number 58.

In 2016, Minister Marion Hall released her ninth album When God Speaks, dropping the stage name Lady Saw. The album became her highest charting album to date, peaking at number four on Reggae Albums chart. She followed up with the released of her tenth album His Grace in July 2018.

Albums

Studio albums

Compilations

Extended plays

Singles

As lead artist

As a featured artist

Notes

References

Reggae discographies
Discographies of Jamaican artists